This list of tallest buildings in the Algeria ranks skyscrapers in the Algeria based on official height.

Tallest buildings
This includes spires and architectural details but does not include antenna masts or minarets. An equal sign (=) following a rank indicates the same height between two or more buildings. The "Year" column indicates the year in which a building was completed.

Under construction 
This lists buildings that are currently under construction in Algeria and are expected to rise to a height of at least . Buildings under construction that have already been topped out are also included.

On-hold, approved or proposed

See also
 List of tallest buildings in Africa
 List of tallest buildings in the world
 List of tallest structures in Algeria

References

Algeria
Tallest
Tallest buildings
Algeria